The committees of the 13th Supreme People's Assembly (SPA) of North Korea were elected by the 1st Session of the aforementioned body on 9 April 2014. It was replaced on 11 April 2019 by the committees of the 14th Supreme People's Assembly.

Committees

Budget

Legislation

Deputy Credentials

Foreign Affairs

References

Citations

Bibliography
Books:
 

13th Supreme People's Assembly
2014 establishments in North Korea
2019 disestablishments in North Korea